The Limerick-Offaly rivalry is a hurling rivalry between Irish county teams Limerick and Offaly, who first played each other in 1994. The fixture has been an irregular one due to both teams playing in separate provinces. Limerick's home ground is the Gaelic Grounds and Offaly's home ground is O'Connor Park.

While Limerick have enjoyed sporadic periods of dominance going back to the early years of the championship, Offaly enjoyed their own successful periods during the 1980s and 1990s. The two teams have won a combined total of fourteen as of 2022 All-Ireland Senior Hurling Championship titles.

As of 2014 Limerick and Offaly have met five times in the hurling championship, with Offaly leading the head-to-head meetings with four victories to Limerick's one.

History

1994: The five minute final

The very first meeting of Limerick and Offaly took place on 3 September 1994 to decide the destination of the 1994 All-Ireland crown. The match was a rather unremarkable affair, save for an explosive final five minutes. Offaly trailed by five points with as many minutes left when they were awarded a close-in free. Johnny Dooley was given the signal from the management team to go for a point; however, he decided to "do something different". The sliotar ended up in the Limerick net, thus opening the floodgates for a remarkable finish. Seconds later the sliotar flew into the Limerick net again, courtesy of Pat O'Connor. Limerick failed to counter as Offaly tacked on some more points to win by 3–16 to 2-13. The "five-minute final" resulted in mixed emotions for Éamonn Cregan, as the Offaly manager had been an All-Ireland winner with Limerick.

2003-2010: Regular qualifier meetings

Almost a decade had passed before the next championship meeting of Limerick and Offaly on 17 July 2003. An early goal from Brendan Murphy handed Offaly the incentive after just five minutes when some dreadful Limerick defending allowed him go on an almost unchallenged 60-yard run that ended with him kicking the sliotar to the back of the net. With the wind behind them, Limerick managed to force their way back into contention, however, Offaly still had a two-point lead at the interval. The Faithful County upped the tempo significantly after the restart. Limerick began to look nervous as they tried to muscle their way back into the game, but their shooting was becoming increasingly ragged and three consecutive wides seemed to affect their confidence. The Shannonsiders subsequently reduced the deficit to just two points to give them a glimmer of hope, however, Offaly finished stronger and recorded a 1–18 to 0-14.

On 1 July 2006 a Limerick team under pressure after installing a new management team midway through the championship faced Offaly for the third time ever. All did not start well for the Shannonsiders as Offaly led by seven points at one stage in the first half after Joe Bergin netted in the opening minutes. A drilled Donie Ryan shot levelled the game for Limerick at 1-12 apiece in injury-time. The sides went point for point in the early stages of the second half and the game was poised at 1-17 apiece before Limerick took charge. A Barry Foley goal gave Limerick the lead and a late Joe Bergin goal from a close-in free mattered for little as Limerick recorded their first ever championship defeat of Offaly.

The qualifier draw threw Limerick and Offaly together again in a knock-out clash on 12 July 2008. Limerick, the All-Ireland runners-up the previous year, welcomed Offaly to their home ground and were expected to easily dispatch the visitors. Joe Bergin was the goal hero with a hat-trick for Offaly, two within the opening twenty minutes, which helped the Leinster team to a 2–11 to 0-6 half-time advantage. Limerick were booed off at the break but returned re-energised immediately after half-time. The Shannonsiders reeled off four unanswered points to reduce the gap to seven points as Brian Carroll missed a couple of frees for Offaly. Limerick's gallop was halted with twenty minutes remaining when Bergin flicked home a sideline cut from midfielder Rory Hanniffy. The final score of 3–19 to 0-18 remains Offaly's biggest championship defeat of Limerick.

The fifth championship clash of Limerick and Offaly took place two years later on 10 July 2010. Limerick, whose regular players refused to line out under manager Justin McCarthy, gained the early initiative with some fine points getting the underdogs off to a solid start. In spite of this Offaly led by 1–8 to 0–7 at half-time, thanks to a 12th minute Derek Molloy goal. Offaly looked for long stretches to be on course for the win, however, they were met with a late onslaught from Limerick who bagged 1-2 inside a five-minute spell to cut the deficit to two points with just eight minutes remaining. Offaly dug deep and tacked on further points to secure a 1–19 to 1–13 victory.

Statistics

All time results

Legend

Senior

Top scorers

External links
 Limerick-Offaly head-to-head results

References

Offaly
Offaly county hurling team rivalries